William Thomas Williams (born July 21, 1948) is a former American football defensive end in the National Football League (NFL) who played for the San Diego Chargers. He played college football at University of California, Davis.

References 

1948 births
Living people
People from Hempstead (town), New York
Players of American football from New York (state)
American football defensive ends
UC Davis Aggies football players
San Diego Chargers players